Mit'u (Quechua for mud, hispanicized spelling Mito) is a mountain in the Andes of Peru which reaches an altitude of approximately . It is located in the Junín Region, Yauli Province, Morococha District, north of Shawaq. Mit'u lies south of the Puka Yaku River ("red water", hispanicized Pucayacu), an affluent of the Mantaro River.

References

Mountains of Peru
Mountains of Junín Region